The slender-footed tyrannulet (Zimmerius gracilipes) is a species of bird in the family Tyrannidae, the tyrant flycatchers. It is found in humid forests of the west Amazon Basin in Venezuela, Colombia, Ecuador, Peru, Bolivia and Brazil. Until recently, it included the Guianan tyrannulet as a subspecies.

References

 Rheindt, F. E., Norman, J. A., & Christidis, L. (2008). DNA evidence shows vocalizations to be better indicator of taxonomic limits than plumage patterns in Zimmerius tyrant-flycatchers. Molecular Evolution and Phylogenetics 48(1): 150–156.

External links
Slender-footed tyrannulet photo gallery VIREO Photo-High Res

slender-footed tyrannulet
Birds of the Amazon Basin
slender-footed tyrannulet
slender-footed tyrannulet
slender-footed tyrannulet
Taxonomy articles created by Polbot